The Gyehae Treaty was signed in 1443 ("gyehae" is the Korean name of the year in the sexagenary cycle) between the Joseon dynasty and Sō Sadamori as a means of controlling Japanese piracy and legitimizing trade between Tsushima island and three Korean ports. It is also called ; 1443 is the third year of the Kakitsu era in the Japanese calendar.

Precedents
Tsushima was then an important trade center. The private trade started between Goryeo, Tsushima, Iki, and Kyūshū, but halted during the Mongol invasions of Japan between 1274 and 1281. The Goryeosa, a history of the Goryeo dynasty, mentions that in 1274, an army of Mongol troops that included many Korean soldiers killed a great number of Japanese on the islands.

Tsushima became one of the major bases of the wokou, Japanese pirates, also called wakō, along with the Iki and Matsuura. Repeated pirate raids made the Goryeo dynasty and the subsequent Joseon dynasty at times placate the pirates by establishing trade agreements and negotiate with the Muromachi shogunate and its deputy in Kyūshū and at times use force to neutralize the pirates. In 1389, General Pak Wi (朴威) of Goryeo attempted to clear the island of Wokou pirates, but uprisings in Korea forced him to return home.

On June 19, 1419, the recently-abdicated King Taejong of Joseon sent General Yi Jongmu to an expedition to Tsushima Island to clear it of the Wokou pirates, using a fleet of 227 vessels and 17,000 soldiers, known in Japanese as the Ōei Invasion. The Korean army returned to the Korean Peninsula on July 3, 1419, and Korea gave up occupation of Tsushima. In 1443, the Daimyo of Tsushima, Sō Sadamori proposed a Gyehae treaty. The number of trade ships from Tsushima to Korea was decided by this treaty, and the Sō clan monopolized the trade with Korea.

Terms

This treaty was signed by Joseon dynasty king Sejong the Great and the Lord of Tsushima island in 1443. The daimyō of the So clan of Tsushima island was granted rights to conduct trade with Korea in fifty ships per year, in exchange for receiving a substantial stipend from the Korean government and aiding to stop any Japanese coastal pirate raids on Korean ports. The treaty was discarded by the revolt of the Sampo in 1510.

See also
List of treaties
Ōei Invasion
Byeon Hyo-mun

References 

Japan–Korea relations
History of the foreign relations of Japan
Gyehae
1440s in Japan
1443 in Asia
15th century in Korea
Gyehae